La Charles Rashawn "C. J." Massingale (born September 23, 1982) is an American-Australian professional basketball player for the Northside Wizards of the NBL1 North. He played three years of college basketball for Washington and one year for Metro State. He moved to Australia in 2005, where he has since played his entire career. He played nine seasons for the Knox Raiders in the SEABL. He had a short stint with the Adelaide 36ers of the NBL in 2012 before playing in Queensland since 2014.

Early life 

Massingale was born in Tacoma, Washington, in 1982.

Career

2000–2003: College 
A native of Tacoma, Washington, Massingale attended the University of Washington in Seattle from 2000 until 2003, after which he transferred to the Metropolitan State University of Denver in 2003 and was a member of the Roadrunners NCAA Division II National Championship winning team in 2004.

2004–2012: Joining SEABL 
After graduating from college in 2004, Massingale moved to Australia in 2005 and joined the Knox Raiders of the South East Australian Basketball League (SEABL). Between 2005 and 2012, he was a six-time Conference All Star (2006, 2008–2012), three-time SEABL MVP (2008, 2010, 2012), four-time SEABL leading scorer (2008–2011), and was the SEABL grand final MVP in 2009. He was the only active player on the SEABL 30th anniversary All Star Team and was named to the SEABL 2000s Team of the Decade.

2012: NBL 
On September 9, 2012, Massingale signed with the Adelaide 36ers as an import for the 2012–13 NBL season. He was released by the 36ers on December 5, 2012. In 10 games, he averaged 4.1 points per game.

2013–2014: Return to SEABL 
Massingale returned to the Knox Raiders for the 2013 SEABL season and averaged 22.2 points, 5.5 rebounds and 2.4 assists in 24 games. He moved to the Brisbane Spartans for the 2014 season.

2015–present: Queensland 
In 2015, Massingale joined the Northside Wizards of the Queensland Basketball League (QBL). In 14 games for the Wizards, he averaged 15.4 points, 3.3 rebounds and 1.7 assists per game.

Between 2017 and 2019, Massingale played for the Sunshine Coast Phoenix in the QBL.

Massingale played for the Southern Districts Spartans during the 2021 NBL1 North season. He returned to the Northside Wizards for the 2022 NBL1 North season.

Personal life 
Massingale and his wife, Leilani, have a daughter named Cydney. In 2014, he became an Australian citizen and now currently works in coaching the next generation of "NC Basketballers".

References

External links 
 FIBA.com profile
 Washington bio
 QBL stats

1982 births
Living people
Adelaide 36ers players
American expatriate basketball people in Australia
American men's basketball players
Basketball players from Tacoma, Washington
Guards (basketball)
Metro State Roadrunners men's basketball players
Washington Huskies men's basketball players